The Rochester Area Colleges is a consortium of higher education institutions in the Rochester, New York metropolitan area in the United States. Founded in 1970, Rochester Area Colleges has numerous area public and private colleges as members, and provides numerous collaborative working opportunities for colleges and their students. The purpose of the association is to support the functions of career development, placement and experiential education in the region. University of Rochester is generally regarded as the premier institution within the consortium.

The consortium consists of:

Alfred State College
Alfred University
Colgate Rochester Crozer Divinity School
Corning Community College
Empire State College
Finger Lakes Community College
Genesee Community College
Hobart and William Smith Colleges
Houghton College
Keuka College
Monroe Community College
Nazareth College
New York Chiropractic College
Roberts Wesleyan College (incl. Northeastern Seminary)
Rochester Institute of Technology
St. Bernard's School of Theology and Ministry
St. Bonaventure University
St. John Fisher College
State University of New York College at Brockport
State University of New York College at Geneseo
University of Rochester
Wells College

Rochester Area Colleges also sponsor a website, biz2edu.com, to assist in regional economic development. This provides economic development organizations, site selectors, corporations, and individuals a gateway to the multitude of resources provided by Rochester's academic institutions.

External links
 biz2edu.com

Education in Rochester, New York
Universities and colleges in New York (state)
College and university associations and consortia in the United States
Universities and colleges in Monroe County, New York